Ryno eller Den vandrande riddaren (Ryno or The Wandering Knight) is an 1834 Swedish-language opera by Eduard Brendler to a libretto by Bernhard von Beskow, which was completed posthumously his patron the Crown Prince Oscar.

Recordings
Ryno. Gothenburg Symphony Orchestra, Members of the Choir of Stora Teatern, Anders Wiklund Sterling 2CD

References

Swedish-language operas